Miles Davis at Fillmore is a 1970 live album by jazz trumpeter Miles Davis and band, recorded at the Fillmore East, New York City on four consecutive days, June 17 through June 20, 1970, originally released as a double vinyl LP. The performances featured the double keyboard set-up Davis toured with for a few months, with Keith Jarrett and Chick Corea playing electronic organ and Fender Rhodes electric piano, respectively. The group opened for Laura Nyro at these performances.

Compositions include, besides the standard "I Fall in Love Too Easily", tracks from his fusion studio albums Bitches Brew and In A Silent Way. The live performances were heavily edited by producer Teo Macero, and the results were named for the day of the week the band performed; only on the 1997 Columbia CD reissue were the compositions and composers identified and indexed. Promotional LP copies divided the sides into short individually titled pieces, but still did not identify the original compositions and composers.

On March 25, 2014, the full recordings of the performances were issued as Miles at the Fillmore - Miles Davis 1970: The Bootleg Series Vol. 3.

Release history
Miles Davis at Fillmore was released on vinyl as a double album, with liner notes written by Morgan Ames of High Fidelity, and Mort Goode. It was released on CD in Japan in 1987, but not made available on CD in the States until 1997, when Columbia released it as one of five live albums from the same period (the others being Live-Evil, In Concert: Live at Philharmonic Hall, Dark Magus, and Black Beauty: Live at the Fillmore West). This reissue featured additional liner notes by drummer Jack DeJohnette. Columbia aimed the release for the jazz market but also for college and alternative radio stations.

Marguerite Eskridge, Davis' girlfriend at the time, appeared in the album cover's photo collage.

Critical reception 

In Christgau's Record Guide: Rock Albums of the Seventies (1981), Robert Christgau found Miles Davis at Fillmore to be less focused than Bitches Brew because the music meandered "unforgivably", particularly Chick Corea and Keith Jarrett's keyboard playing on "Wednesday". He said the tracks should have been edited down together to highlight the "treasures" they each offer, including "the cool atmospherics that lead off Wednesday, the hard bop in extremis toward the end of Thursday, the way Miles blows sharply lyrical over Jack DeJohnette's rock march and Airto Moreira's jungle sci-fi for the last few minutes of Friday, all the activity surrounding Steve Grossman's solo on Saturday". In The Rolling Stone Album Guide (2004), J. D. Considine said At Fillmore abandoned the more lyrical music of Black Beauty in favor of "a frenzied, clangorous approach".

Track listing

1970 double LP 
Columbia – G 30038, C 30241, C 30242:

1997 CD Reissue 
Columbia – C2K 65139:

Personnel 
Musicians
 Miles Davis – trumpet with Harmon mute
 Steve Grossman – tenor saxophone, soprano saxophone
 Chick Corea – Fender Rhodes electric piano with delay/fuzz pedals and ring modulator
 Keith Jarrett – Fender Contempo Organ with delay/fuzz pedals + tambourine
 Dave Holland – electric bass guitar with wah-wah pedal
 Jack DeJohnette – drums
 Airto Moreira – cuica, transverse flute, whistle, kazoo, shakers, bells, woodblock, tambourine

Production
 Teo Macero – producer
 Stan Tonkel – recording engineer
 Russ Payne – mixing engineer
 Nick Fasciano – original cover design
 Jim Marshall – cover photography
 Don Hunstein – original liner photography

See also
Black Beauty: Miles Davis at Fillmore West
Miles Davis discography

References

Bibliography

External links
 
 "Miles Davis's '70s: The Excitement! The Terror!" by Robert Christgau

1970 live albums
Albums produced by Teo Macero
Columbia Records live albums
Legacy Recordings live albums
Live at the Fillmore East albums
Miles Davis live albums